Scott Tinley (born October 25, 1956) is a former professional triathlete and two-time winner of the Ironman World Championships in Hawaii. In the 1980s Tinley dominated the sport of triathlon together with Mark Allen, Dave Scott and Scott Molina. Tinley was inducted into the Ironman Hall of Fame in 1996.

Now retired, Tinley is a writer, teacher, and ocean lifeguard.  His latest book, In the Wake of Our Past, is a character-driven, work of historical fiction that focuses on a returning Vietnam War vet. His previous book, Racing the Sunset, a journey through athlete retirement and the larger issues of life transition and change, is the result of one of the most thorough research projects ever attempted on retiring athletes.

Tinley taught English and "Sport and Society" at San Diego State University, and currently teaches "Sports, Games, and Culture" at San Diego State University. This 7th generation Southern Californian currently (2020) resides in Del Mar, California with his wife and has two grown children.

References

External links
Scott's Website
Scott's Publications
Scott Tinley's Adventures Triathlon

Ironman world champions
American male triathletes
Living people
1956 births